Bukidnon(), officially the Province of Bukidnon (Binukid and Higaonon: Probinsya ta Bukidnon), is a landlocked province in the Philippines located in the Northern Mindanao region. Its capital is the city of Malaybalay. The province borders, clockwise from the north, Misamis Oriental, Agusan del Sur, Davao del Norte, Cotabato, Lanao del Sur, and Lanao del Norte. According to the 2020 census, the province is inhabited by 1,541,308 residents. 
The province is composed of 2 component cities and 20 municipalities. It is the third largest province in the country in terms of total area of jurisdiction behind Palawan and Isabela respectively.

The name "Bukidnon" means "highlander" or "mountain dweller." Occupying a wide plateau in the north central part of the island of Mindanao, the province is considered to be the food basket of the region, being the major producer of rice and corn. Products from plantations in the province also include pineapples, bananas and sugarcane.

Situated within Bukidnon is Mount Dulang-dulang, the 2nd highest mountain in the country, with an elevation of  located in the Kitanglad Mountain Range. Mount Kitanglad (2,899 m), Mount Kalatungan (2,860 m), Mount Maagnaw (2,742 m), Mount Lumuluyaw (2,612 m), and Mount Tuminungan (2,400 m), the 4th, 5th, 8th, 17th, and 30th highest mountains in the country respectively, are also found in the province.

Bukidnon was consecutively ranked 5th in the list of richest provinces in the Philippines for four straight years according to the Commission on Audit's 2018, 2019, 2020, and 2021 Annual Financial Reports which were posted in 2019, early to late 2021, and 2022, respectively.

History

Cultural history

According to oral history of the indigenous people of Bukidnon, there were four main tribes in Central Mindanao: the Maranaos who dwell in Lanao del Sur, and the Maguindanao, Manobo and Talaandig tribes who respectively inhabit the eastern, southern, and north-central portions of the original province of Cotabato. When the civil government divided central Mindanao into provinces at the turn of the 20th century, the groups included in the province of Bukidnon are the Talaandig and the Manobo, as well as other smaller Lumad tribes. The Visayans, particularly the Cebuanos and the Hiligaynons from the Northern Mindanao coastline and the southern Visayas, migrated into the province. The Visayans are still referred to by the Lumad as the dumagat ("sea people") to distinguish them from the original mountain tribes. This was followed by various groups from Luzon, namely, the Ilocanos, the Igorots and the Ivatans, many of whom were merchants and wealthy entrepreneurs. All contributed massive acculturation among the indigenous tribes. Most of those who moved to the mountains and forest continued to hold on their ancestors' cultural heritage. The wide variety of Filipino groups now thrives in the province and contributed immensely in the socioeconomic development.

Political history

Bukidnon became a part of Misamis in the latter part of 1850. The whole area was then called "Malaybalay" and the people were known as Bukidnons (highlanders or mountain dwellers). The Philippine Commission, then headed by Commissioner Dean C. Worcester, Secretary of Interior, proposed the separation of Bukidnon from Misamis Province. On August 20, 1907, the Philippine Commission Act No. 1693 was enacted the Province of Agusan and sub-province of Bukidnon. Bukidnon became a regular province on March 10, 1917, by virtue of the creation of the Department of Mindanao and Sulu under Act 2711.

In 1942, invading Japanese troops entered Bukidnon. Mount Capistrano was a civilian evacuation area in the World War II. In 1945, the province was liberated from Japanese occupation by Filipino and American troops with the aid of Bukidnon-based Filipino guerrillas during the Second World War.

Geography
Bukidnon is a landlocked plateau in North Central Mindanao. It is bounded on the north by Misamis Oriental and Cagayan de Oro; on the south by North Cotabato and Davao City; on the east by Agusan del Sur and Davao del Norte; and west by Lanao del Sur. It lies between parallels 7°25' and 8°38' north latitude and meridians 124°03' and 125°16' east longitude.

It has two important landmarks, Mount Kitanglad and Pulangi River. Pulangi River, on the other hand, traverses through the northeastern and southern part of the province towards the Rio Grande de Mindanao.

Land area
The province's total land area is ,10,498.59 making it the largest in Mindanao in terms of land area. It accounts for 59 percent (59%) of Northern Mindanao. Thirty-eight percent (38%) is alienable and disposable. The rest is classified timberland.

It also accounts for 80 percent (80%) or 34 million metric tons of the region's nonmetallic mineral deposits, which include high grade white and red clay, gold, chromite, copper, serpentine, manganese, quartz and limestone deposits can also be found in the province.

Topography

Bukidnon is generally characterised as an extensive plateau but the southern and eastern boundaries are mountainous area. Gently rolling grassland plateau cut deep and wide canyons of the Cagayan, Pulangi, and Tagoloan Rivers and their tributaries, which cover a greater part of the province. The whole eastern and southern border adjoining the provinces of Agusan, Davao del Norte, and Cotabato are covered by lofty and densely forested mountains of the Pantaron Mountain Range (Central Cordillera). The Bukidnon plateau is mainly of volcanic zone consisting of pyroclastic, basaltic and andesitic cones.

The Central Cordillera is a mountain range of sedimentary, metamorphic and igneous rocks. About 49% of the land resource of the province is of rugged hills and mountains and 33% of undulating to rolling terrain. The rest of the province is composed of nearly level terraces, alluvial lowland, canyons and gorges.

Climate
Two types of climate prevail between the northern and southern sections of Bukidnon, The northern part is classified as belonging to Type III, that is, there is no pronounced rain period but relatively dry during the months of November to May. In the southern portion of the province, the climate is classified as Type IV with no dry season. The driest area is Baungon, while the wettest is the Calabugao plain. The climate is relatively cool and humid throughout the year.

Just like in other parts of the country, rainfall is more pronounced from June to October compared to other months of the year. February to April are the drier months.

Temperature ranges vary with elevation.

Relative humidity also varies with elevation, with those above 500 m having relative humidity of about 80%, while areas lying below , 65-7 percent. Thus, the Malaybalay-Impasug-ong area and those around the volcanic cones approximate semi-temperate conditions and can support the cultivation of highland tropical crops.

Based on the records of climatological stations within and near the province, lithology and land form, three agro-ecological zones are identified. Another covers the high altitude volcanic plains, the Malaybalay-Impasug-ong area, and the foot slopes of Mount Kitanglad, and Mount Kalatungan.

Bodies of water

Bukidnon is known as the watershed of Mindanao. It is endowed with six major river systems namely: Pulangi, Tagoloan, Cagayan, Manupali, Muleta, and Bobonawan Rivers. These rivers carved the landscape of the province creating numerous canyons.

The Pulangi River, considered the longest river in the province, is a tributary of the Rio Grande de Mindanao. Its headwaters are found in the mountains of Kalabugao, Impasugong. It is the largest as well as the longest river found in the province. It covers the following cities and municipalities of the province: Impasugong, Malaybalay, Cabanglasan, San Fernando, Valencia, Maramag, Quezon, Don Carlos, Kitaotao, Dangcagan, Kibawe and Damulog.

The Tagoloan River has its headwaters in the mountains of Can-ayan, Malaybalay. It traverses the province northwestward passing through Malaybalay, Impasugong, Sumilao, Manolo Fortich, Malitbog and finally empties into the sea at Tagoloan, Misamis Oriental.

The Cagayan River watershed is found mostly in the municipality of Talakag. Its headwaters are found in the Kitanglad Mountain Range in central Bukidnon. The river flows northward through the municipalities of Talakag and Baungon. Its mouth lies at Cagayan de Oro in Misamis Oriental, where it is the main source of potable water.

The Manupali River, a major tributary of the Pulangi River, starts in the mountains of Lantapan, Bukidnon, picking up tributaries along the way from the Kalatungan and Kitanglad Mountain Ranges. It forms part of the natural boundary of the Valencia and Lantapan. It flows eastward towards Malaybalay, eventually joining the Pulangi River in Valencia.

The Muleta River is found in the southern portion of the province covering the municipalities of Pangantucan, Don Carlos, Kitaotao, Dangcagan, Kibawe, Kadingilan and Damulog. It is another important tributary of the Pulangi River and flows southward. It will join the Pulangi River in the boundary of Bukidnon and Cotabato province.

The Bobonawan River, found in the municipality of Cabanglasan, is another tributary of the Pulangi River. It covers most of the parts of the municipality, flowing southward towards Pulangi River.

Aside from the relatively important river systems, various lakes also dot the landscape of the province. Pinamaloy Lake, in Don Carlos, Bukidnon, is the biggest in the province covering about 50 hectares. It was named after Barangay Pinamaloy, the place where the lake is located. Another lake is found in Pigtauranan, Pangantucan called the Napalit Lake. The lake covers an area of 36 hectares and is one of the tourist spots in Pangantucan, Bukidnon. There are 24 floating islets in the lake. The third significant inland body of water in the province is Apo Lake at Guinoyoran, Valencia. It occupies an approximate area of 25 hectares. A man-made lake called Maramag Basin is found in Maramag, Bukidnon, which was the result of the construction of the Pulangi IV Hydroelectric Dam of the National Power Corporation (NPC) in the course of the Pulangi River.

There are also numerous springs and waterfalls located in the province. Some of the waterfalls include the Alalum Falls, Dimadungawan Falls, Dila Falls, Gantungan Falls, Natigbasan Falls, Sagumata Falls, Magubo Falls, and Balisbisan Falls.

Politics and administration

Administrative divisions
Bukidnon is subdivided into 20 municipalities and 2 cities.

Barangays

The province has 464 barangays under its jurisdiction. The table below shows the Top 20 Largest Barangays according to population.

Legislative districts

Bukidnon has four legislative districts namely the first, second, third and fourth districts.

Demographics

Based on the 2020 census, Bukidnon has a total population of 1,541,308 residents.

In the 2000 census, males slightly edge the females with 546,234, accounting for about 52% of the province's total population while females, with 514,181, account about 48%. Based on age distribution, Bukidnon has a fairly young population, with ages 14 and below accounting 42.15% or 446, 952. The 15-34 age bracket account for 33.68% of the province's population or 357,112. Ages 55 and above barely accounts 6.5% of the total. The average population growth rate of the province is 2.05% (2.03% if exponential) from 2000 to 2010. Male-to-female ratio in the province stood at 1.06.

Population density
The average population density for the province is 128 persons per square km. The cities/municipalities with the highest population densities are the following: Don Carlos (353/km2), Kitaotao (250/km2), Valencia (244/km2), Maramag (213/km2) and Quezon (202/km2). The cities/municipalities with the lowest densities, on the other hand are: Impasugong (29/km2), Talakag (58/km2), San Fernando (63/km2), Malitbog (75/km2) and Damulog (83/km2).

Population by congressional districts

District III has the highest population among the four provincial congressional districts, with 31.86% of the total population of the province. It is followed by District II with 26.45% of the total population and District I with a population share of 21.36%. The least populated district is District IV with population percentage share of 20.33%.

Valencia has the highest population among the cities/municipalities of the province with 192,993 inhabitants, accounting 13.64% of the province's total. It is closely followed by Malaybalay with 174,625 inhabitants or 12.34% of the provincial population. Quezon is at third with 104,116 inhabitants or 7.36% of the total, with Maramag and Manolo Fortich rounding out the fourth and fifth with 102,089 and 100,210 inhabitants, respectively.

The four largest local government units of Bukidnon (Valencia, Malaybalay, Quezon, and Maramag) are clustered together in the central part of the province. It is also in the national roads of these cities/municipalities that daily road use volume are high.

Languages

The lingua franca of the region is Cebuano. Minority languages include Higaonon, Bukid, Ilianen, Matigsalug, Hiligaynon, Maranao, Iranun, Ilocano, and Waray. Tagalog and English are generally understood and widely used in schools, business, and government offices.

Religion

The majority of the population are Christians (predominantly Roman Catholic, 80.7% with significant other Christian denomination minority, 15%), followed by Islam (4%) while other religious groups are adhered by 0.3%.

Ethnicity

According to ethnicity, majority of the people in Bukidnon are Cebuano accounting for approximately 41% of the total population. The Bukidnon lumads (Bukidnon, Higaonon, Manobo, Talaandig, etc.) account for about 24% of the total population of the province. The Maranaos form about 8% of the total population followed by the Hiligaynon/Ilonggo and Boholano groups with 12.7% and 7.37%, respectively, of the province's total population.

Indigenous inhabitants of Bukidnon are the Lumad peoples, including the Bukidnon, Higaonon, Manobo, and Talaandig. Their cultures and traditions are embodied in oral folk literature of the province, which are classified into; Antoka (riddles), Basahan (proverbs or wise sayings), Kaliga (ceremonial songs), Limbay (lyric poem), Sala (love song), Idangdang (ballad), Ulaging (epic), and Nanangon (folktales). Religion is monotheistic. They believe in one God. Magbabaya (the ruler of all) has minor gods and goddesses under his command (Example: Bulalakaw watches rivers and lakes, Tumpas Nanapiyaw or Itumbangol watches the bases of the earth, night, and day).

Many of the province's inhabitants, however, are descendants of immigrants from Cebu or elsewhere in Central Visayas.

Economy

Bukidnon is an agricultural economy. It is a major producer of rice, maize, sugar, coffee, rubber, pineapple, banana, tomato, flowers, cassava, and other fruits and vegetables. Almost all large firms operating in the province are into production or processing of these agricultural products. Recognized by the Food and Agriculture Organization as a foot-and-mouth disease-free province, it is also a major producer of poultry, hogs, goats, and cattle.

The Philippine Carabao Center's outlet in Central Mindanao University makes dairy products from water buffalos. Due to being landlocked, Bukidnon relies on the nearby cities of Cagayan de Oro and Davao for the supply of marine products. However, the province has its own supply of freshwater products such as tilapia, carp, catfish, mudfish, gourami, barb, goby, climbing perch, freshwater eels, giant freshwater prawn or shrimps, native freshwater snails or freshwater clams, and freshwater crabs, either via inland fishing or fry production aquaculture in inland fish farms and fish hatcheries.

Del Monte Philippines, Inc. (DMPI), Lapanday Diversified Products Corp. and Mt. Kitanglad Agri-Development Corporation are engaged in pineapple production. Dole Philippines (Skyland) and Mt. Kitanglad Agri-Ventures, Inc. are into banana production. DMPI is also engaged in cattle fattening. Bukidnon Sugar Milling Corporation (BUSCO) and Crystal Sugar Milling are into sugar milling and refining.

Phil-Agro Industrial Corporation is in starch production. Menzi Agricultural Development is in cacao production. Agaropyta Phils. Inc., Bukidnon Greens Inc., FP Obrero Farms and ARDEM, Inc. are in cutflower production.

Food manufacturing giants, San Miguel Foods Corp. (SMPFCI), Monterey Farms Corp., Swift Foods, Inc. have intensified their contract breeding and growing operations in the province. Valencia Rubbertex, Inc., an 80-20 Japanese-Filipino joint venture produces rubber boots and rubber shoes for Japan.

As one of the major anchors in crop production, Bukidnon is moving forward towards establishing its position as a principal trader of rice, corn, sugar, potato, tomato and many other commercial and industrial crops. As the second largest producer of corn in the country, it reached a total production of 481,370 metric tons. In year 2000, vast tracts of cornfields, rice paddles, and sugar plantations are distributed all over the province.

Bukidnon has already assumed its role as producer and supplier of fresh fruits and vegetables. These produce are either sold in domestic markets or exported to Japan and other neighboring countries. Fresh pineapples, banana, sugarcane and cutflower grown over the years are among its exports. New agri-business industries are still growing such as strawberry farming. Even export of rubber boots and shoes, an infant industry in the province is increasing tremendously.

A wide variety of resource-based handicrafts is extensively produced from rattan, bamboo, and wood. San Fernando is known for its rattan furniture. Bamboo baskets, wood wares and carvings, mats, and other handmade products are ideal souvenir items.

Bukidnon Investment Grid
During the mid-1990s, the provincial government of Bukidnon, after careful studies and consultation, has adopted a strategic program called the Bukidnon Investment Grid or BIG. This program is aimed to confine all its investment promotion activities and projects to the strip of land three kilometers from both sides of the Sayre Highway from Damulog to Manolo Fortich, and along the national/provincial road from Kibawe to Kadingilan; Don Carlos to Kadingilan; Maramag to Quezon; Maramag to Kadingilan; Kadingilan to Pangantucan; Valencia City to San Fernando; Malaybalay City to Cabanglasan; Malaybalay to Lantapan; Manolo Fortich to Libona; Libona to Cagayan de Oro; Talakag to Pangantucan; and Malitbog to Tagoloan in Misamis Oriental.

Transportation

The province is very well accessible by road primarily from the cities of Cagayan de Oro and Davao with alternate road networks as well from the cities of Butuan (via Agusan del Sur), Iligan (via Talakag), Marawi (via Talakag), Tagum (via San Fernando), and the province of Cotabato.

The entire province is bisected from north to south by the four-lane Sayre Highway from Cagayan de Oro to Kabacan, North Cotabato via Maramag (Bukidnon–Cotabato Road); and by the two-to-four lane Bukidnon–Davao Road (colloquially known as "BuDa") from Quezon to Davao City. Both are components of National Route 10 (N10) of the Philippine highway network, and a spur of the Asian Highway 26 (AH26) of the Asian highway network. The Sayre Highway intersects with the BuDa Road in the barrio of Dologon in Maramag, where it changes to route N943 and continues on to Dangcagan, Damulog, and Kabacan.

The Sayre Highway (formerly "Route 3") was renamed in honor of Francis Bowes Sayre, Sr., the U.S. Philippine High Commissioner who spearheaded its construction during the American occupation of the Philippines.

There are several airstrips in the province being used by private firms. Commercial flights used to be flown from the Malaybalay Airstrip, but it was closed down by the provincial government in the late 1990s. The airport where it used to be located was converted into a low-cost housing project. A proposed domestic airport site in the municipality of Don Carlos has already been on the talks since 2008 and in 2013, the Bukidnon Airport Development Project proposal was finalized. Budget allocation was done in 2017 and construction started in 2018. There are no seaports in Bukidnon because the province is landlocked. The nearest passenger seaport is in Cagayan de Oro.

Education

Universities and colleges
The following universities and colleges of Bukidnon are the tertiary schools.

Festivals

The province celebrates the Kaamulan Festival, an ethnic cultural festival held annually in Malaybalay, Bukidnon from the mid-February up to March 10, the founding date of the Bukidnon as a province in 1917. It is held to celebrate the culture and tradition of the seven ethnic tribal groups—Bukidnon, Higaonon, Talaandig, Manobo, Matigsalug, Tigwahanon, and Umayamnon—that originally inhabit the province. Kaamulan comes from the indigenous Binukid word amul meaning "to gather". Kaamulan is gathering for a purpose—a datuship ritual, a wedding ceremony, a thanksgiving festival during harvest time, a peace pact, or all of these together. The festival started in 1974 and is celebrated until now. It is the only authentic ethnic festival in the Philippines.

Bukidnon Hymn: Bukidnon My Home

The Provincial Hymn was composed by Filomeno Bautista between 1925 and 1932. Nimecio Jun Beltran authored a provincial resolution requiring the singing of the provincial hymn in all and every events in the Province of Bukidnon where the Philippine National Anthem is also sung.

Notable people

 Gerald Tabios - elite endurance athlete
 Arcelle Tadena - scaled crossfit athlete
 Alfredo Lagamon - Associate Justice, Court of Appeals
 Caesar Fortich - Secretary of Agriculture
 Clare Cabiguin – Pinoy Big Brother: Teen Edition 1 - 4th Placer
 Elenito Galido - Bishop of the Roman Catholic Diocese of Iligan
 Joey Ayala - singer-songwriter and composer
 Juan Miguel Zubiri - politician
 Lorenzo S. Dinlayan - USEC, Office of Cultural Communities
 Oona Barretto - scholar of Pinoy Dream Academy (season 1)
 Nelbert Omolon - PBA Player
 Nereus Acosta - politician
 Reynan Dal-Anay - 1st Runner-up of The Voice Kids (Philippines season 2)
 Roel Manlangit - Grand Champion of Pilipinas Got Talent (season 4)
 Romeo M. Recina - Brig. Gen., PC-INP Recom 11 Commander
 Sheree (real name Sweet Faye V. Bautista) - Singer / dancer / model & actress (former Viva Hot Babe)
 Virgilio Garcillano - former government official
 Ivy Grace Paredes – The X Factor UK 2016 contender
 Rowell "Roy" Ucat – internet celebrity, songwriter, popularly known as "Medyo Maldito"
 Mario Fernandez – a multi-medalist national boxer
 Teofisto Guingona III – politician/former senator
 Archie Gamboa - 21st Chief of the Philippine National Police
 Samuel Duran (real name Samuel Quilab) – professional boxer; former WBC International Bantamweight Champion and former OPBF Featherweight Champion
Leonil B. Lazarito – international boxing promoter/matchmaker, professional boxing manager
 Mark Anthony N. Geraldo – professional boxer; former WBO Asia-Pacific youth super flyweight champion and PBF bantamweight champion
 Manny Pacquiao – Filipino professional boxer and senator born in Kibawe

See also
 Kitanglad Mountain Range

References

External links

 
 
 Provincial Government of Bukidnon
 Philippine Standard Geographic Code listing for Bukidnon

 
Provinces of the Philippines
Provinces of Northern Mindanao
States and territories established in 1914
1914 establishments in the Philippines
Former sub-provinces of the Philippines